Jesús María is a town in the region of Los Altos of the Mexican state of Jalisco, approximately 2 hours east of Guadalajara.  The population of  Jesús María is 18,982 as of 2015.

History

The official name of Jesús María Municipality has its origin in the colonial age that is why in its respective name there is no reference to any pre-Hispanic word

The city was founded in 1530 by Spaniard Nuño de Guzmán who worked under Hernán Cortés. The town used to be part of the Spanish Empire  (New Spain) before the Revolution, part of Nueva Galicia. In 1776 it was named Barranca de Viudas, after three Spanish women who founded the town. The region before that was populated by different tribes, The Toltecs (623 to 626) Chichimecas (800-1150)the Huicholes and finally the Aztecs in 1164 till the Spanish Conquest.

Demographics
The indigenous population of Jesús María, as of 2005, stands at .03%. Most of its population is, in colonial terms, Criollo (Mexican born Whites) or Mestizo (Amerindian and European Spanish).

Economy
Most of its economy depends on agriculture. 90% of it is corn, the rest are beans, wheat, pumpkin, sábila and agave for tequila production. 
Stockbreeding is used for exports to Guadalajara and 51% is used for internal consumption and sale. Its industries include factories for candy, tequila, shoes, and clothing. Touristic places of interest include the Templo Parroquial, a popular landmark constructed between 1835 and 1840. It is 30 meters high and has an unusual squared look to it. During the months of December and January for the "Las Fiestas Patronales" thousands of people from all over Mexico and the United States return to celebrate in honor of "La Sagrada Familia."

References

External links 
City web site 

Populated places established in 1530
Municipalities of Jalisco